Alex Martínez Beltrán (born August 25, 1991) is a former Uruguayan professional footballer. Currently he serves as head of recruitment for Charlotte FC.

Career

Early career
Born in Montevideo, Uruguay, Martinez moved to the United States at the age of 9 and attended High Point University where he played college soccer for the High Point Panthers from 2010 to 2011. He then was recruited to play for the NC State Wolfpack where he played till 2013. He also played for Carolina Dynamo of the USL Premier Development League in 2013.

Sporting Kansas City
On January 21, 2014 Martinez was selected in the third round of the 2014 MLS SuperDraft by Sporting Kansas City and was officially signed by the Major League Soccer club on March 4, 2014. He then made his professional debut for Sporting on March 15, 2014 against FC Dallas when he came on as a 75th-minute substitute as Sporting drew 1–1. He was released by the club on June 30, 2014.

In August 2014, Martinez signed with Orange County Blues FC of United Soccer League. After the Blues' season ended, Martinez signed a short-term contract with Carolina RailHawks of the North American Soccer League.

Martinez signed with United Soccer League expansion side Charlotte Independence in March 2015.

Personal life
He is the younger brother of Enzo Martínez who currently plays for Birmingham Lesion.

Career statistics

References

External links 
 

1991 births
Living people
Footballers from Montevideo
Uruguayan footballers
Uruguayan expatriate footballers
Uruguayan expatriate sportspeople in the United States
High Point Panthers men's soccer players
NC State Wolfpack men's soccer players
Soccer players from South Carolina
North Carolina Fusion U23 players
Sporting Kansas City players
Orange County SC players
People from Rock Hill, South Carolina
North Carolina FC players
Charlotte Independence players
Association football midfielders
Expatriate soccer players in the United States
Sporting Kansas City draft picks
USL League Two players
Major League Soccer players
USL Championship players
North American Soccer League players